A small but damaging tornado outbreak impacted northern Texas, south-central Oklahoma, northern Louisiana, and northern Alabama in mid-May 2013. The outbreak was the result of an upper-level shortwave trough that tracked across the Southern Plains of the United States. An associated low-pressure area and atmospheric instability resulted in the formation of tornadoes across northern Texas and Oklahoma on May 15. Afterwards the storm system weakened as it tracked westward, though six additional tornadoes were reported in Texas, Louisiana, and Alabama in the two days following May 15. Over a period of nearly two days, the storm system produced 26 tornadoes in four states. The strongest of these was an EF4 tornado which struck Hood County, Texas on May 15. However, on May 16 and May 17 no tornadoes were confirmed to have been stronger than EF1 intensity.

The EF4 tornado in Hood County, Texas, accounted for all six deaths caused by the severe storms, making it the first deadly tornado event in Texas since the 2007 Piedras Negras-Eagle Pass tornadoes. An additional 63 people were injured, many of which were due to the same EF4 tornado. A second tornado, rated EF3, was similarly damaging and impacted areas southwest of Cleburne, Texas, injuring seven. Damage across the four states due to the storm system reached roughly $272 million in damage.

Meteorological synopsis

The outbreak was caused by an upper-level shortwave trough that moved northeastward from Mexico into the Southern Plains states during the nighttime the morning of May 15. The Storm Prediction Center (SPC) in Norman, Oklahoma, a division of the National Weather Service, initially issued a slight risk of severe thunderstorms early that morning over northwestern Texas, for a threat of large hail and damaging winds. A low-pressure area associated with the trough moved over Oklahoma that day, producing light to moderate rainfall and non-severe thunderstorms across that state into parts of North Texas. Later forecasts expanded the slight risk further into northern and Central Texas, and later into far southern Oklahoma, and indicated an enhanced risk of a few isolated tornadoes in North Texas.

The atmosphere began to destabilize due to a decrease in cloud cover over western and central Texas; the sunshine and heating, combined with sufficient wind shear and abundant low-level moisture, combined to produce a very unstable air mass. The SPC issued a severe thunderstorm watch from southern Oklahoma to central Texas that afternoon around 3:00 p.m. CDT. Supercells broke out in parts of northwestern Texas during the late afternoon hours, one of which developed the first tornado of the day at 5:38 p.m., near Belcherville in Montague County. A second tornado spawned by the same storm, rated as an EF1, touched down near Lake Amon G. Carter, damaging four homes and destroying one. As forecasters realized that conditions now favored tornadic activity, the SPC issued a tornado watch from far southern Oklahoma into central Texas at 6 p.m. CDT, replacing parts of the original severe thunderstorm watch.

At 7:13 p.m. CDT, storm spotters reported a large tornado on the ground near Millsap in Parker County, which caused roof damage to several homes in the town. This tornado remained on the ground as another tornado began to intensify near Mile Marker 409 on I-20 southeast of Weatherford, Texas at 7:19 p.m. NWS doppler radar briefly detected both tornadoes, indicating the storm was a cyclical supercell (a type of supercell that can produce successive tornadoes), before the Millsap tornado finally dissipated.

An EF4 tornado hit the town of Granbury, Texas in Hood County around 8 p.m. CDT, damaging or destroying around 100 homes and killing at least six people, with the most severe damage occurring in the Rancho Brazos neighborhood; the Granbury storm was the first violent tornado to hit North Texas since an F4 tornado killed three people in Lancaster in Dallas County on April 25, 1994. The supercell that produced the Granbury tornado later spawned an EF3 tornado that hit the Fort Worth suburb of Cleburne in Johnson County around 9:30 p.m. CDT, producing its most significant damage just east of Lake Pat Cleburne. The last twister of the outbreak touched down at 12:19 a.m., producing EF1 damage in the Ellis County town of Ennis, Texas, south-southeast of Dallas. In total, the system produced at least 16 tornadoes that afternoon and evening across north and central Texas, from Montague to Coryell counties.

The system continued to spin up tornadoes on May 16 and 17, though not of the same severity as the storms that occurred on the 15th, each causing only minor to moderate damage of EF0 and EF1 intensity. Four additional tornadoes occurred near the Shreveport metropolitan area on May 16, two of which touched down near Waskom, Texas, and two in Caddo Parish near the towns of Greenwood and Stonewall, Louisiana. Two short-lived tornadoes touched down in Limestone County, Alabama on May 17, causing scattered damage to trees, roofs and a barn.

Confirmed tornadoes

May 15 event

May 16 event

May 17 event

See also

List of North American tornadoes and tornado outbreaks
April 1994 tornado outbreak
Tornado outbreak of April 3, 2012
Tornado outbreak of May 18–21, 2013

Notes

References

External links 
 Tornadoes Across North Texas May 15th, 2013 (NWS Fort Worth)

Tornadoes of 2013
F4 tornadoes by date
 ,2013-05-15
Tornadoes in Alabama
Tornadoes in Texas
Tornadoes in Oklahoma
Tornadoes in Louisiana
May 2013 events in the United States
2013 natural disasters in the United States